Tamarakuro Debekeme (born 24 October 1990 in Bayelsa, Nigeria) is a footballer, who plays for Nasarawa United F.C.

Career
Debekeme began his career with Bayelsa United, earning his first professional game on 17 November 2008 against Enyimba Aba and signed than in May 2009 for Warri Wolves.
He moved to Nasarawa for the 2013 season.

References 

1990 births
Living people
Nigerian footballers
Association football midfielders
Warri Wolves F.C. players